Phakding  is a small village in the Khumbu region of Nepal. It lies in the Dudh Kosi river valley just north of Lukla and south of Monjo, at an altitude of 2,610 m, one of the UNESCO World Heritage Site since 1979.

The trail starts at Lukla and Phakding is often the main stopping point for trekkers on their way to Mount Everest via the Gokyo Ri route or Tengboche route.

The primary function of the village is to support the tourism industry and as such consists of a number of guesthouses.

See also 
 Everest Base Camp

References

Populated places in Solukhumbu District